George Frederick William Pattinson (6 May 1914 – 5 November 2003) was an Australian rules footballer who played with Essendon in the Victorian Football League (VFL).

Pattinson spent the 1941 season at Williamstown in the VFA, playing 10 games and kicking 2 goals and being awarded the best utility trophy in his only season with 'Town before the Association went into recess due to the Second World War. Pattinson returned to the Bombers in 1942. 

The son of St Kilda player Artie Pattinson, George Pattinson later served in the Royal Australian Air Force from 1943 until 1947.

Notes

External links 
George Pattinson's profile at Australianfootball.com

George Pattinson's playing statistics from The VFA Project

1914 births
2003 deaths
Australian rules footballers from Victoria (Australia)
Essendon Football Club players
Williamstown Football Club players